"Red Tape" is a song by French singer Amanda Lear released in 1981 by Ariola Records as the single from her album Incognito.

Song information 
"Red Tape" was composed and produced by Anthony Monn, Lear's long-time collaborator, and is a pop song with rock influences. In the song's lyrics, Amanda Lear criticises the so-called "red tape", complaining about its inquisitiveness and the lack of privacy it imposes. She sings: "I want to keep my privacy, Big Brother is watching me". On its parent album, where every song stands for a "deadly sin", "Red Tape" represents bureaucracy.

The song was released as the single only in France, with a French-language version of "New York" on side B, which was not available on the album. The single did not chart.

In the 2017 book Europe's Stars of '80s Dance Pop, the song is mentioned as one of Lear's "noteworthy tracks" from the 80s.

Music video 
The music video pictures Amanda clad in a futuristic outfit and sunglasses, playing Rubik's Cube.

Track listing 
7" Single
A. "Red Tape" – 3:55
B. "New York" – 4:28

References 

1981 singles
1981 songs
Amanda Lear songs
Ariola Records singles
Songs written by Amanda Lear
Songs written by Anthony Monn